Rhaphiolepis (  or  ) is a genus of about fifteen species of evergreen shrubs and small trees in the family Rosaceae, native to warm temperate and subtropical East Asia and Southeast Asia, from southern Japan, southern Korea and southern China, south to Thailand and Vietnam. In searching literature it is well to remember that the name commonly is misspelt "Raphiolepsis". The genus is closely related to Eriobotrya (loquats), so closely in fact, that members of the two genera have hybridised with each other; for example the "Coppertone loquat" is a hybrid of Eriobotrya deflexa X Rhaphiolepis indica. The common name hawthorn, originally specifically applied to the related genus Crataegus, now also appears in the common names for some Rhaphiolepis species. For example, Rhaphiolepis indica often is called "Indian hawthorn", and Rhaphiolepis umbellata, "Yeddo hawthorn".

Description

The species vary in size, some only reaching , while R. ferruginea can reach . The flowers are white or pink,  diameter, produced in small to large corymbs with panicle structure. The fruit is a small pome  diameter, ripening dark purple to black, usually containing only a single seed.

Taxonomy
Rhaphiolepis is closely related to loquats and toyon and is in the apple subtribe along with many other commercially important fruit like pears. Recent phylogenetic research has suggested Rhaphiolepis and Eriobotrya (loquats) be merged.

Research suggests the following phylogenetic relationships:

Cultivation and uses

The best known species is Rhaphiolepis indica (Indian hawthorn) from southern China, grown for its decorative pink flowers, and popular in bonsai culture. Rhaphiolepis umbellata (Yeddo hawthorn) from Japan and Korea has blunter leaves and white flowers.

The fruit of some varieties is edible when cooked, and can be used to make jam, but some ornamental varieties bear fruit that is of no culinary value.

Indian Hawthorn is a mainstay horticultural specimen in southern United States. It is often found in commercial as well as in private landscapes. Often it is trimmed into small compact hedges or balls for foundation plants.

The use of Rhaphiolepis in landscapes in humid regions is limited by the susceptibility of many of its species and hybrids to a disfiguring leaf spot disease caused by fungi in the genus Entomosporium.

Gallery

References

 
Rosaceae genera
Indomalayan realm flora